Guitar Idol is an international online talent competition for unknown guitarists.  The guitarists compete through 3 online heats and one online knock-out round, for a chance to fill 12 places to play at the London International Music Show. The competition has been running since 2008. The competition was postponed in 2010 due to the London International Music Show not having sufficient funds to go ahead with it that year.

Winners 
  2008 Gustavo Guerra from Brazil.

 2009 Jack Thammarat from Thailand.
 2010 The competition was postponed due to issues with obtaining a venue for the live final.
 2011 (Guitar Idol III) Don Alder from Canada.
 2014 (Guitar Idol IV) Andre Nieri from Brazil.
 2016 (Guitar Idol VI) Phil Short.
 2018 (Guitar Idol VII) Paulo Romão Zorba from Brazil.
 from UK

References

External links

Guitar Idol, Lick Library
 jamtrackcentral.com

Guitar competitions